The vaquejada is a sport typical to the Nordeste region of Brazil, in which two cowboys ("vaqueiros") on horseback pursue a bull, seeking to pin it between the two horses and direct it to a goal (often consisting of chalk marks), where the animal is then knocked over.

On October 6, 2016, the Brazilian Supreme Court ruled that the vaquejada is illegal and against the Brazilian Constitution. The subject came into matter when the Government of the State of Ceará approved a state law regarding the practice. The General Attorney appealed against it to the Supreme Court, stating in the lawsuit that the animals where treated with cruelty. In its favor, the Government of Ceará sustained that it was a cultural event and represented an important part of local economy. According to the Government of Ceará, the vaquejada creates over 200 thousand jobs.

The city with the largest vaquejada in the world is Serrinha, in Bahia state.

The Supreme Court's decision has national coverage.

References

Further reading

Bullfighting
Bull sports
Sports originating in Brazil
Rodeo in Brazil